The Women's singles event of badminton at the 2010 Commonwealth Games was held from 9 to 14 October 2010 in Siri Fort Sports Complex, New Delhi, India.

Seeds
The seeds for the tournament were:

Results

Finals

References

Sources
Commonwealth Games 2010: Draws: WS
Delhi 2010: DETAILED SCHEDULE: Badminton

External links
Commonwealth Games results

Badminton at the 2010 Commonwealth Games
Com